Lucy Riall is an Irish historian. She was a professor of history at Birkbeck, University of London, and is currently a professor in the Department of History and Civilisation at the European University Institute in Florence.

Biography
Riall studied at the London School of Economics and the University of Cambridge. She was a lecturer in Modern European history at the University of Essex before moving to Birkbeck. Since 2004 she has been editor of the journal European History Quarterly.

Among her many prestigious awards are a visiting professorship at the Ecole Normale Superieure in Paris and a senior fellowship at the University of Freiburg's Institute of Advanced Study.

One of the leading experts on modern Italy, Riall has written on nineteenth-century state-formation and nationalism in Italy and Sicily. Several of her books treat the history of the Risorgimento; Garibaldi: Invention of a Hero (2007) examined the popular cult of Giuseppe Garibaldi as a global cultural phenomenon.

Riall speaks fluent Italian and she appears frequently on Italian TV and radio (RAI) as well as on the BBC.

Works
The Italian Risorgimento: State, Society, and National Unification, Routledge, 1994.
Sicily and the Unification of Italy: Liberal Policy and Local Power, 1859-1866, Oxford University Press, 1998.
(ed. with David Laven) Napoleon’s Legacy: Problems of Government in Restoration Europe, Berg, 2000.
Garibaldi: Invention of a Hero, Yale University Press, 2007 (Italian translation, Laterza, 2007).
Risorgimento: The History of Italy from Napoleon to Nation State, Palgrave Macmillan, 2009 (Italian translation, Donzelli 2009).
"Martyr Cults in Nineteenth-Century Italy," The Journal of Modern History Vol. 82, No. 2, June 2010.
Under the Volcano: Revolution in a Sicilian Town, Oxford University Press, 2013.

References

External links
EUI profile
Birkbeck homepage
Garibaldi: the patriot as global hero

 Italian Radio piece by Lucy Riall on Italian unification

Alumni of the London School of Economics
Alumni of the University of Cambridge
Historians of Italy
Living people
Year of birth missing (living people)